Ahti Kõo (born 29 March 1952) is an Estonian lawyer, writer and former politician.

Kõo graduated from Otepää Secondary School in 1970 and from the Faculty of Law at the University of Tartu in 1975. He then worked as a prosecutor (in the years 1976-1990) in Tartu, Jõgeva and Pärnu. Later, he acted as a sworn advocate.

From 1979 to 1990, Kõo was a member of the Communist Party of Estonia. From 1990 to 1992, he was a  member of the Supreme Soviet of the Republic of Estonia, where he voted to restore Estonia's independence. From 1993 to 1996 and from 1999 to 2002, he was the Vice-Chairman of Pärnu City Council, later becoming the mayor of Pärnu briefly in 2005. He later was a city council member again from 2007 to 2010. From 2002 to 2007, he was a part of the Res Publica Party, which later became the Fatherland and Res Publica Union Party. From 2007 to 2010, he was a member of the Reform Party.

Bibliography
 2010: Oleme seda väärt
 2012: Salamees
 2015: Võimukõdi
 2016: Äraeksinu

Awards
 2003: 5th Class of the Estonian Order of the National Coat of Arms (received 23 February 2003)
 2006: 3rd Class of the Estonian Order of the National Coat of Arms (received 23 February 2006)

References

Further reading
 "Kes on kes Eesti poliitikas", Eesti Entsüklopeediakirjastus 1992

1952 births
Living people
People from Otepää Parish
University of Tartu alumni
20th-century Estonian lawyers
Estonian male novelists
Voters of the Estonian restoration of Independence
Estonian Reform Party politicians
Isamaa politicians
Mayors of Pärnu
Recipients of the Order of the National Coat of Arms, 3rd Class
Recipients of the Order of the National Coat of Arms, 5th Class
20th-century Estonian politicians
21st-century Estonian politicians
21st-century Estonian lawyers